Upperthorpe may refer to one of these places in England:
Upperthorpe, Derbyshire
Upperthorpe, Lincolnshire
Upperthorpe, Sheffield, a suburb of Sheffield